Max Miller is the name of:

People
Max Miller (comedian) (1894–1963), British comedian 
Max Miller (wrestler), American Olympic wrestler
Max O. Miller (inventor), American inventor and film producer
Max O. Miller (director) (1918–1992), American television and film director
Max B. Miller (1937–2011), American film director and photographer
Max Miller (jazz musician) (1911–1985), American jazz musician
Max Miller (politician), U.S. representative and political advisor
Max Miller (YouTuber), American chef, creator and host of Tasting History

Characters 
Max Miller, a character on the television series Life with Derek

See also

 
 
 Maxwell Miller (disambiguation)
 Mack Miller (disambiguation)
 Miller (disambiguation)
 Max (disambiguation)